The 2015–16 NZ Touring Cars Cars Championship is the seventeenth season of the series, and the first under the NZ Touring Cars name. The field comprises two classes racing on the same grid. Class one features both V8ST and NZV8 TLX cars, while class two consists of older NZV8 TL cars.

Seven events will be played as competition in the 2015-16 season.

Entrants

Calendar

Round 2 was held in support of the 2015 ITM 500 Auckland while Round 6 was in support of the 2016 New Zealand Grand Prix.

References

External links
 Driver standings on Database.com

Touring Cars
Touring Cars
NZ Touring Cars Championship seasons